The Archaeolithophyllaceae are a family of algae that are thought to represent the stem lineage of the corallinaceae.

See also

References

Fossil algae
Mississippian first appearances
Guadalupian extinctions